Charles Conner could refer to:

Charles Fremont Conner (1857–1905), American artist
Charles Franklin Conner (born 1957), American lobbyist and former acting U.S. Secretary of Agriculture

See also
Charles Connors (disambiguation)